Frederic Löhe (born 12 August 1988) is a German football goalkeeper who currently plays for FC Gießen.

Career
On 28 October 2008, he made his debut for Borussia Mönchengladbach's first team on a Bundesliga match in a 3–0 away loss against VfL Wolfsburg.

References

External links
  

1988 births
Living people
German footballers
Borussia Mönchengladbach players
Borussia Mönchengladbach II players
Hessenliga players
SV Sandhausen players
SV Babelsberg 03 players
Alemannia Aachen players
Bundesliga players
3. Liga players
Regionalliga players
Association football goalkeepers
TSV Steinbach Haiger players